The Acsenda School of Management – Vancouver (also known as Acsenda), formerly known as Sprott Shaw Degree College, is a private, for-profit Canadian degree college headquartered in Vancouver, British Columbia, Canada. Patrick Dang was the president of Acsenda from 2010 until 2014. Dr. Lindsay Redpath took over as President in 2014 and continued in the role until July 31, 2017. Neil Mort officially took up the role as the current president in 2018.

History
Acsenda School of Management is a private, for-profit institution based in Vancouver. The current campus is located at 666 Burrard Street. Formerly known as Sprott-Shaw Degree College, the name was changed to Acsenda School of Management in 2013. The institution has consent from the Minister of Advanced Education to offer both the Bachelor of Business Administration (BBA) and Bachelor of Hospitality Management (BHM) programs.  

In 2004, Sprott Shaw Community College (SSC) decided to expand its educational offerings. The goal was to offer SSC graduates and others an easier way to obtain a BBA. After receiving the rights by the Minister of Advanced Education to offer the new degree,SSC had to differentiate the two schools. Sprott Shaw Degree College (SSD) was created with the intention of distinguishing itself from its vocational offerings.  

The current president of Acsenda School of Management is Mr. Neil Mort, and the current Chancellor is Sir John Daniel. In 2016, Acsenda School of Management became part of the EduCo Education Group  which provides post-secondary programs in 16 educational institutions and partnerships in four countries.

Academics 
Acsenda School of Management is a private institution. The institution offers two undergraduate degree programs: the Bachelor of Business Administration (BBA) and the Bachelor of Hospitality Management (BHM). 

The Bachelor of Business Administration (BBA) has been offered by Acsenda since 2004 and is a 4-year undergraduate degree program. The BBA degree contains seven concentrations: human resources, marketing, accounting, international business, general business, financial management and management information systems. The Bachelor of Hospitality Management (BHM) has been offered by Acsenda since 2016 and is also a 4-year undergraduate degree program.

Faculty 
Many faculty and instury professionals, offering theoretical and practical teaching methods.  Students also have an opportunity for an international internship, allowing them to link classroom learning to the workplace environment.

Campus 
Acsenda School of Management has had four campuses in its history. The first campus was located in Burnaby, then moved to West Georgia and Granville Street, after that 1090 West Pender Street. Nowadays, the Acsenda campus is located in downtown accessible by Vancouver’s SkyTrain. Acsenda is well connected via public transport, biking, or walking with nearby cities and public areas. The campus is located at 666 Burrard St, Vancouver.  The campus is equipped with well-furnished classrooms as well as high-speed wireless internet connection, computer labs, student forums, cafeteria, and a library.

Student life

Campus activities 
The campus enjoys of a moderate climate. It is surrounded by an urban environment; the city of Seattle is 142 miles (230 km) drive away, and Victoria at the southern end of Vancouver Island is 71 miles (115 km) drive from Acsenda.

Acsenda’s student support and student life program are based on a wellness model. The school provides a wide range of events and activities for students, academic success seminars and career readiness workshops.  A student society is made up of all students of Acsenda and elects its leaders to represent the student body. Students also provide representation on the Academic Council. In 2019, Acsenda initiated the Student Ambassador program, highlighting student leaders who go out of their way to help the staff on-campus and improve the local community.

The college hosts workshops, events, webinars, celebrations, conferences, and speakers on campus as well as smaller activity-based events.

Culture 
Acsenda School of Management has diversity of students and staff from many countries and backgrounds. It provides various opportunities for students to experience different cultures, traditions, beliefs, and to be part of an inclusive community. For instance, celebration of various cultural events/holidays helps students to learn and experience other cultures.

Clubs 
Many clubs have been organized at Acsenda, including: Hospitality Club, Marketing Club, Accounting Club, IBM Club, Human Resources Management Club, Leadership Entrepreneurship and Development Club (LEAD) and Gaming Club.

See also 

 List of colleges in British Columbia
 List of universities in British Columbia
 Higher education in British Columbia
 Education in Canada

References

External Links
 Official website
 Acsenda Virtual Tour

Universities and colleges in Greater Vancouver
2015 establishments in British Columbia
Educational institutions established in 2015